Zhutovo 2-ye is a rural locality (a selo) and the administrative center of Zhutovskoye Rural Settlement, Oktyabrsky District, Volgograd Oblast, Russia. The population was 754 as of 2010. There are 10 streets.

Geography 
Zhutovo 2-ye is located in steppe, on Yergeni, 37 km southeast of Oktyabrsky (the district's administrative centre) by road. Samokhino is the nearest rural locality.

References 

Rural localities in Oktyabrsky District, Volgograd Oblast